Anoplostethus is a genus of beetles belonging to the family Scarabaeidae.

Species:

Anoplostethus laetus 
Anoplostethus lamprimoides 
Anoplostethus opalinus 
Anoplostethus roseus

References

Scarabaeidae